Timothy F. "Tim" Degnan (February 23, 1940 – November 20, 2022) was an American politician from Illinois.

Early life and education 

Born in Chicago, Illinois, Degnan went to St. Ignatius College Prep. He then went to University of Illinois and Illinois Institute of Technology.

Political career 

After Richard M. Daley was elected Cook County State's Attorney in the 1980 general election, Degnan was appointed by the 23rd District Democratic Legislative Committee to succeed Daley in the 81st General Assembly. Degnan served in the Illinois Senate from 1980 to 1989 and was a Democrat. In 1989, he served as intergovernmental affairs director for the mayor of Chicago, Richard M. Daley.

Personal 

Degnan died at his home in Oak Brook, Illinois on November 20, 2022.

Notes

1940 births
2022 deaths
Politicians from Chicago
University of Illinois alumni
Illinois Institute of Technology alumni
Democratic Party Illinois state senators